Paul O'Dea (July 3, 1920 – December 11, 1978) was an American professional baseball player, manager and scout.

A native of Cleveland, Ohio and alumnus of Case Western Reserve University, O'Dea began his professional career with the Fargo-Moorhead Twins in 1938. He played in 62 games for the Twins and had a .362 batting average. The following season he played for the Springfield Indians, hitting .342 in 122 games, and due to his hitting the Indians brought him to spring training in 1940. During that time, he was hit in the right eye by a foul ball, causing blindness. Despite the injury, he remained in the Indians organization the next four years, and made his major league debut on April 19, 1944.

O'Dea spent the two full seasons with the 1944–1945 Indians; he was exempt from reporting to service for World War II due to his earlier eye injury. He was primarily an outfielder, but also played first base and was a left-handed pitcher. In 163 Major League games, O'Dea's career batting average was .272; in his four games on the mound, he did not earn a decision, with an earned run average was 5.68 in 6 innings pitched. O'Dea had a .318 batting average in 1944 in 76 games. He hit his only big-league home run off Don Black of the Philadelphia Athletics on May 19, 1945, in a 2–1 Cleveland victory at League Park. After the 1945 season ended, he was sent back to the minors, which ended his major league career.

O'Dea returned to the minor leagues and played for five more seasons, from 1946 to 1948 and from 1950 to 1951. He then served as a manager of various Indians' Class C and Class D farm system teams between 1947 and 1960. He then spent the rest of his life as a scout for the Indians, until his death at the age of 58.

References

External links

1920 births
1978 deaths
Baseball players from Cleveland
Burlington Indians players (1947–1949)
Case Western Spartans baseball players
Cedar Rapids Raiders players
Charleston Senators players
Cleveland Indians players
Cleveland Indians scouts
Enterprise Boll Weevils players
Fargo-Moorhead Twins players
Flint Arrows players
Flint Gems players
Fort Smith Indians players
Major League Baseball outfielders
Milwaukee Brewers (minor league) players
Minor league baseball managers
Portsmouth Cubs players
Rockford Rox players
Springfield Indians (baseball) players
Toledo Mud Hens players
Wilkes-Barre Barons (baseball) players